So What You Want? is a studio album released on December 12, 1995 by the Washington, D.C.-based go-go band Rare Essence.

Track listing

Side A (The Studio)
"Go All Out" – 5:45
"So What You Want?" – 5:58
"Must Be Like That" – 4:45
"Bitch Nigga" – 3:35
"Come Back" – 7:06

Side B (Live at the Eastside Club)
"Must Be Like That" (featuring Doug E. Fresh) – 6:47
"Where They At?" – 2:26
"And Uhh" – 3:52
"Where My Troopers At?" – 9:00
"So What You Want?" – 5:06
"20 Minute Workout" – 7:22

Personnel
 Charles "Shorty Corleone" Garris – vocals
 Andre "Whiteboy" Johnson – electric guitar, vocals
 Michael "Funky Ned" Neal – bass guitar
 Donnell Floyd – vocals, saxophone
 Kent Wood – keyboards
 Milton "Go-Go Mickey" Freeman – congas, percussion
 Derick Paige – trumpet, vocals

References

External links
So What You Want at Discogs

1995 albums
Rare Essence albums